The 16th G7 Summit was held at Houston between July 9 and 11, 1990. The venue for the summit meetings was the campus of Rice University and other locations nearby in the Houston Museum District.
 
The Group of Seven (G7) was an unofficial forum which brought together the heads of the richest industrialized countries: France, West Germany, Italy, Japan, the United Kingdom, the United States, Canada (since 1976), and the President of the European Commission (starting officially in 1981). The summits were not meant to be linked formally with wider international institutions; and in fact, a mild rebellion against the stiff formality of other international meetings was a part of the genesis of cooperation between France's president Valéry Giscard d'Estaing and West Germany's chancellor Helmut Schmidt as they conceived the first Group of Six (G6) summit in 1975.

Leaders at the summit

The G7 is an unofficial annual forum for the leaders of Canada, the European Commission, France, Germany, Italy, Japan, the United Kingdom, and the United States.

The 16th G7 summit was the first for Japanese Prime Minister Toshiki Kaifu. It was also the last summit for British Prime Minister Margaret Thatcher.

Participants
These summit participants are the current "core members" of the international forum:

Agenda

July 9
President George H.W. Bush unofficially opened the summit the night before the first official round of meetings was scheduled. He hosted a rodeo and barbecue with "armadillo races, bull riding, barrel racing, calf scrambling, the Grand Ole Opry, an Old West village, cowboys and Indians, oil rigs, square dancing, a sheriff with silver spurs, Styrofoam cacti, a model of the space shuttle, horseshoe contests, 1,250 gallons of barbecue sauce and jalapenos, 500 pounds of onions, 5,000 servings of cobbler and carrot cake, and 650 gallons of lemonade and iced tea."

July 10
The official opening ceremonies were held outside in the Academic Quadrangle at Rice University. The leaders stood on a specially built platform with air conditioners built into the floor which only afforded a measure of relief as temperatures rose to near 100 degrees. This platform was located in front of Lovett Hall, a Romanesque revival administration building designed by Ralph Adams Cram and built in 1912.

At the close of initial speeches by each leader, the group moved inside, into the building's Founders Room, for their first working session in the building's "Founders Room." The talks lasted about two hours.

A working dinner at Bayou Bend, once the home of a philanthropist, Ima Hogg, and now a museum of American decorative arts was scheduled. The food, including tortilla soup and grilled red snapper with basil lime sauce, was prepared by three of the premier chefs in Texas.

July 11

In addition to their talks about significant international problems, the world leaders set aside some time to dine together in a formal affair which took place in Houston's Museum of Fine Arts (MFAH).

Issues
Each leader attending the economic summit has a slightly different perspective about the priorities which need to be addressed by the group working together

The summit was intended as a venue for resolving differences among its members. As a practical matter, the summit was also conceived as an opportunity for its members to give each other mutual encouragement in the face of difficult economic decisions. Issues which were discussed at this summit included:
The International Economic Situation
International Monetary Developments and Policy
The International Trading System
Direct Investment
Export Credits
Reform in Central and Eastern Europe
The Soviet Union
The Developing Nations
Third World Debt
The Environment
Narcotics

Accomplishments
In 1990, as in 1989, the summit leaders proclaimed the necessity to fight climate change, restore the Ozone layer, protect the biodiversity and restore forests. http://www.g7.utoronto.ca/summit/1990houston/declaration.html#environment

Budget
Houston spent nearly $20 million on civic beautification projects in advance of the summit.

Involving the local community

Disgraced Enron Chief Executive and Chairman of the Board Kenneth Lay was the co-chairman of the organizing committee for economic summit for G-7 nations.

Art Installation
A large sculpture was commissioned by Bush for the event. It ultimately consisted of several rectangular light pillars with the designs of the flags of the seven participating countries (plus the flag of Europe). After the summit, the sculpture was relocated to Houston Intercontinental Airport, which was renamed in honor of the former President some years later.

Gallery

See also
 G8

Notes

References
 Bayne, Nicholas and Robert D. Putnam. (2000).  Hanging in There: The G7 and G8 Summit in Maturity and Renewal. Aldershot, Hampshire, England: Ashgate Publishing. ; OCLC 43186692 ( 2009-04-29)
 Reinalda, Bob and Bertjan Verbeek. (1998).  Autonomous Policy Making by International Organizations. London: Routledge.  ; ;   OCLC 39013643

External links
 No official website is created for any G7 summit prior to 1995 -- see the 21st G7 summit.
 University of Toronto: G8 Research Group, G8 Information Centre
  G7 1990, delegations & documents

G7 summit
1990 in Houston
1990 in international relations
1990 in Texas
G7 summit
G7 summit 1990
G7 summit 1990
G7 summit 1990
1990
July 1990 events in the United States